Heyday may refer to:

 Titled works:
 Music:
 Heyday (The Church album), a 1986 album by the Church
 Heyday (Fairport Convention album), a 1987 album by Fairport Convention
 Heyday (novel), a historical novel by Kurt Andersen
 Media-production organizations:
 Heyday Books, an independent nonprofit publisher based in Berkeley, California
 Heyday Films, a British film production company
 Heyday Records, an independent record label founded in 1988 by Pat Thomas
 Other:
 Heyday (horse) (born 1987)
 Hey Day, a tradition at the University of Pennsylvania